Georg Eduard Albert Krugers (4 November 1890, in Banda Neira – 10 August 1964, in The Hague; also written as G. Kruger) was a cameraman and film director active in the Dutch East Indies (modern Indonesia) during the early 20th century. He is recorded as having worked in film since the mid-1920s, and in 1927 he made his directorial debut, Eulis Atjih. He joined hajj pilgrims in 1928 and screened the resulting documentary in the Netherlands. His 1930 film Karnadi Anemer Bangkong is thought to be the first talkie in the cinema of the Indies, but was a commercial failure as the majority Sundanese audience considered it insulting. After making two works for Tan's Film in the early 1930s, Krugers moved to Hong Kong and then the Netherlands.

Silent film

Sources disagree regarding much of Krugers' life. J. B. Kristanto's Katalog Film Indonesia lists him as having been born in Hong Kong, but does not give a year. However, a 1933 newspaper report gave Krugers' age as 43 and his place of birth as Banda Neira, and a Georg Eduard Albert Krugers is known to be born there in 1890. 

Krugers is recorded as having been active in film in the mid-1920s, leading the laboratory at N.V. Java Film. He may have been one of its founders, together with the Dutchman L. Heuveldorp. The company exclusively produced documentaries until 1926, when Heuveldorp directed the colony's first feature film, Loetoeng Kasaroeng. Krugers served as a cameraman for the film, which was based on a Sundanese folktale, also processing the film in his laboratory in Bandung.

The following year, Krugers directed his own film, titled Eulis Atjih, which followed the beautiful Eulis Atjih as she falls into poverty after being left by her husband. International release emphasised the ethnographic aspects of the film. The film was a commercial failure, but Krugers told his backers that the film had recouped its expenses. Later that year Krugers left Java Film to form his own company, Krugers Filmbedrijf (Krugers Film Company),

By 1928 he was reportedly working on film adaptations of the folktales Roro Mendut and Prono Tjitro, although it is not known if he finished them. He did, however, complete a documentary entitled Het Groote Mekka-Feest (The Great Mecca Feast) which followed hajj pilgrims from the Indies during their trip to Mecca. The film premiered in Leiden, the Netherlands, on November 8, 1928. This premiere was attended by numerous Dutch socialites, including Princess Juliana, and given an introduction by Dutch Orientalist Christiaan Snouck Hurgronje.

Talkies
The first talkies shown in the Indies, Fox Movietone Follies of 1929 and The Rainbow Man (both 1929), came from the United States and were screened in late 1929. This encouraged Krugers to make Karnadi Anemer Bangkong (Karnadi the Frog Contractor), an adaptation of the book by Yuhana, in 1930. The comedy, made with a single system camera that Krugers had obtained with the help of his Society of Motion Picture and Television Engineers membership, is generally thought the first locally produced talkie released in the country, but had poor technical quality. It was a critical failure, as the majority Sundanese audience felt that they were being insulted; contemporary director Joshua Wong suggested that this poor reception was partly owing to the main character eating a frog, something which is forbidden for Muslims.

Following this failure, Krugers made the documentary Atma De Vischer (1931), which followed Queen Wilhelmina and Prince Hendrik on a trip through the Hague, before being signed to Tan's Film. With Tan's, Krugers made two films. First he was asked to handle cinematography on Bachtiar Effendi's 1932 talkie Njai Dasima, an adaptation of G. Francis' 1896 novel Tjerita Njai Dasima (Story of Njai Dasima). He then directed and produced Huwen op Bevel (Forced to Marry; 1931), which was advertised as featuring songs and comedy. The film was a commercial failure, leading to all rights being acquired by Tan's. He is recorded as planning a further two films, De Nona (Of Ladies) and Raonah, but neither was made.

During 1934 and early 1935, all feature films released in the Dutch East Indies had been produced by The Teng Chun. This situation was created by the Great Depression, which had led to the Dutch East Indies government collecting higher taxes, advertisers asking for more money, and cinemas selling tickets at lower prices; this ensured that there was a very low profit margin for local films. During this period cinemas in the country mainly showed Hollywood productions. Krugers left the Indies in 1936 and moved to Hong Kong. He later returned to the Netherlands, where he died in 1964.

Filmography

References
Footnotes

Bibliography

External links

 Luitgard Mols & Arnout Vrolijk: Western Arabia in the Leiden Collections. Traces of a colourful past. Leiden, Leiden University Press, 2016. . About Krugers: 'The First Documentary Film on the Hajj' (pag. 76-77)

1890 births
1964 deaths
Cinematographers of the Dutch East Indies
Film directors of the Dutch East Indies
Film producers of the Dutch East Indies
Film score composers of the Dutch East Indies
People from Maluku (province)